The Golden Avio F30 is an Italian ultralight aircraft designed by Stelio Frati and produced by Golden Avio, a division of Golden Car, an automotive parts and prototyping company located in Caramagna Piemonte. The aircraft is supplied as a kit for amateur construction or as a complete ready-to-fly-aircraft.

The aircraft's designation is a homage to the Ferrari F40 Italian automobile built from 1987 to 1992.

Design and development
The aircraft was designed to comply with the Fédération Aéronautique Internationale microlight rules. It features a cantilever low-wing, a two-seats-in-side-by-side configuration enclosed cockpit under a bubble canopy, fixed or retractable tricycle landing gear and a single engine in tractor configuration.

The aircraft is made from sheet aluminum.

The FG model received German certification in 2011 and the RG version in 2015.

Variants

F30 RG
Retractable landing gear model.
F30 FG
Fixed landing gear model, also called the Brio.

Specifications (F30 RG)

References

External links

2000s Italian ultralight aircraft
Homebuilt aircraft
Single-engined tractor aircraft
Low-wing aircraft